The 2014 European Parliament election in Spain was held on Sunday, 25 May 2014, as part of the EU-wide election to elect the 8th European Parliament. All 54 seats allocated to Spain as per the Treaty of Lisbon were up for election.

The People's Party (PP) emerged as the largest party overall, albeit with its worst nationwide election result in 25 years with a mere 26.1% of the share and 16 seats, losing 2.6 million votes and 8 seats from its 2009 result. The Spanish Socialist Workers' Party (PSOE) lost 9 seats and 2.5 million votes, obtaining just 23% of the total party vote and 14 seats. This would represent the party's worst election result in recent history until the 2015 general election, in which it scored a new low. Up to 8 additional political forces obtained representation. Pablo Iglesias' newly formed Podemos party (Spanish for "We can") turned into the election night surprise by winning 5 seats and 1,253,837 votes (7.98% of the share), an unprecedented result for a party only 4 months old and contesting an election for the first time. Podemos's surge and the extent of PP and PSOE collapse were not foreseen by opinion polls during the campaign, which had predicted higher support for the two dominant parties and a weaker performance of Podemos.

United Left's Plural Left coalition and Union, Progress and Democracy (UPyD) obtained some of their best historical results, with 10.0% and 6.5% of the vote and 6 and 4 seats, respectively. However, this was far from the major election breakthrough that polls had predicted throughout 2013 and in early 2014. From this point onwards both parties would lose support in opinion polls and in successive regional and local elections. The Citizens (C's) party of Albert Rivera, then marginalised as a Catalonia-only party and after several failed attempts to jump into national politics, managed to obtain 3.16% of the share and 2 seats. Just as Podemos, it would grow in support in the run up to the next general election and become a major political actor by 2015.

Electoral system
The 54 members of the European Parliament allocated to Spain as per the Treaty of Lisbon were elected using the D'Hondt method and a closed list proportional representation, with no electoral threshold being applied in order to be entitled to enter seat distribution. Seats were allocated to a single multi-member constituency comprising the entire national territory. Voting was on the basis of universal suffrage, which comprised all nationals and resident non-national European citizens over 18 years of age and in full enjoyment of their political rights. Amendments to the electoral law in 2011 required for Spaniards abroad to apply for voting before being permitted to vote, a system known as "begged" or expat vote. The use of the D'Hondt method might result in an effective threshold depending on the district magnitude.

Outgoing delegation

Parties and candidates
The electoral law allowed for parties and federations registered in the interior ministry, coalitions and groupings of electors to present lists of candidates. Parties and federations intending to form a coalition ahead of an election were required to inform the relevant Electoral Commission within ten days of the election call. In order to be entitled to run, parties, federations, coalitions and groupings of electors needed to secure the signature of at least 15,000 registered electors; this requirement could be lifted and replaced through the signature of at least 50 elected officials—deputies, senators, MEPs or members from the legislative assemblies of autonomous communities or from local city councils. Electors and elected officials were disallowed from signing for more than one list of candidates.

Below is a list of the main parties and electoral alliances which contested the election:

Campaign

Party slogans

Development
The electoral campaign started at 12:00 am on 9 May. However, a traffic accident in Badajoz resulting in the deaths of 5 people (1 adult and 4 children) and 12 injured forced the suspension of the start of the campaign in Extremadura.

On Monday 12 May, Isabel Carrasco, president of the provincial government of Leon and member of the PP, was shot dead in the street. Policial investigation concluded that the crime's motive were of vengeance, since the two women arrested for committing the crime, wife and daughter of the Chief Inspector of the Police of the nearby town of Astorga, were affiliated to the PP; one of them having been previously fired from the Provincial Deputation presided by Carrasco.

This event forced another suspension of the campaign for 24 hours by most major political parties, except for some minoritary parties who chose not to stop their campaigns.

Election debates

Opinion polls
The table below lists voting intention estimates in reverse chronological order, showing the most recent first and using the dates when the survey fieldwork was done, as opposed to the date of publication. Where the fieldwork dates are unknown, the date of publication is given instead. The highest percentage figure in each polling survey is displayed with its background shaded in the leading party's colour. If a tie ensues, this is applied to the figures with the highest percentages. The "Lead" column on the right shows the percentage-point difference between the parties with the highest percentages in a given poll. When available, seat projections are also displayed below the voting estimates in a smaller font.

Results

Overall

Distribution by European group

Elected legislators
The following table lists the elected legislators:

Outcome
The election resulted in a massive loss of support for the two main political parties of Spain, which together fell from a combined total of 80.9% in the previous European election to a record-low 49.1% of the vote (a net total of −31.8 pp, about −16.0 each one). Podemos, a party founded four months previously running on an anti-austerity platform, won an unprecedented 8.0% of the vote and 5 out of 54 seats to the European Parliament; the best result ever scored in Spain by a newly created party in its first electoral test.

The People's Party (PP) came out on top in most autonomous communities except in Andalusia, Asturias and Extremadura, where the PSOE won; the Basque Country, where the PNV prevailed; and Catalonia, where ERC scored first place for the first time in 80 years. In these last two communities the PP polled in fourth and fifth places, respectively. Significant were, however, their results in Madrid, Valencian Community and Murcia; in the first two it polled below the 30% mark for the first time in 25 years, while in the latter it experienced a spectacular drop in support, falling from the 60% mark it had maintained since the 2000 general election to below 40% of the vote. Also, except for the autonomous cities of Ceuta and Melilla, it didn't surpass the 40% mark in any region, not even its strongholds of Galicia (where it polled a mere 35%), Castile and León or Castile-La Mancha (38% in both of them).

The Spanish Socialist Workers' Party (PSOE), except for those communities where it won, experienced a significant drop in support. It suffered most notably in Catalonia and Basque Country (where it finished in 3rd place). In Catalonia in particular, the PSOE's sister party, the Socialists' Party of Catalonia, had previously won all general and European elections held in the region–except for those of 1994 and 2011, where it polled second just behind Convergence and Union–. Until this election, the worst result of the party in this region in such elections had been the 2011 result of 26.7%; in this election it fell to 14.3%.

Other parties benefiting from the collapse in support for the PP and PSOE parties were United Left-led Plural Left (IP) coalition, which with a 10.0% obtained its best results nationally since 1996, and Union, Progress and Democracy (UPyD), whose 6.5% would remain the highest the party would win in a nationwide election before their decline throughout 2015. The Citizens party (C's) entered the European Parliament with 2 seats and 3.2% of the vote.

Aftermath
The election backlash had immediate consequences on the Socialist party (PSOE), which scored its worst result ever in an election held at a nationwide scale: a bare 23.0% of the vote, compared to the already disappointing results the party had obtained in the general election of 2011, with 28.8%. Alfredo Pérez Rubalcaba, which had won the party's leadership on a 2012 party federal congress, announced his intention to resign from his post after his party holds an extraordinary Federal Congress on 19–20 July to elect a new Secretary-General, ahead of the scheduled November Socialist primaries to elect the party's candidate for the 2015 election. Rubalcaba also announced his intention not to run in these primaries. Several regional party leaders followed suit and announced their intention to hold regional extraordinary party congresses as well.

On the other hand, People's Party (PP) leaders refused to publicly acknowledge the negative results of the party in the election, despite losing 40% of its 2009 vote and scoring the worst result the party has obtained in a national election since 1989, instead opting to highlight the fact that they had won the election. Despite this, the party had to cancel the victory celebration that was to be held in their national headquarters in Madrid due to the poor affluence of party supporters which went to the place, a result of election results much worse than expected. Concerns arose among party regional leaders on the prospects of such electoral results being displayed at the local and regional level in the May 2015 elections, something which could potentially force the PP out from the government of party strongholds' such as Madrid and Valencia.

On 26 May El País ran the headline "Harsh punishment to PP and PSOE", whilst El Mundo declared that "Bipartisanship crumbles". International media focused instead on the rise of Podemos party, with the BBC headlining that "Spain's 'we can' party proves it can" or "Spain's Podemos party challenges system", while others stated how the final election results "stunned analysts and pollsters".

Abdication of King Juan Carlos I

One week after the election, Spanish King Juan Carlos I announced his intention to abdicate in favour of his son, Felipe. Allegedly, the election results had no influence in the King's abdication. Rather, the elderly monarch had taken the decision the day of his 76th birthday in January and had spoken about it with Prime Minister Mariano Rajoy on 31 March and with opposition leader Rubalcaba three days later, but it was not until after the election that he announced it in order not to affect the electoral process. However, abdication was not regulated under the Spanish Constitution of 1978 and thus required the approval of an Organic Law on the matter. PP, PSOE, UPyD, CC, FAC and UPN all pledged their support for the law's approval. Attention then turned to the PSOE leader Alfredo Pérez Rubalcaba as rumours spread about him not resigning right away the day after the election to keep controlling the party so as to ensure the affirmative vote of its parliamentary group on the law. This was received with criticism from several of the party's regional federations but also from its members and the Socialist Youth, openly republican, who demanded the party ask for a referendum on the monarchy issue.

Furthermore, there was speculation on the opportunity of the King abdicating at the time he did. In fact, due to the crisis of the bipartisanship self-evidenced by the European election results, the idea of the King announcing his decision before the 2015 general election, when the election results could translate into PP and PSOE losing a host of seats in the Congress of Deputies, making the building of large majorities more difficult, became extended among public opinion. The fact that the future of the Spanish Socialist Workers' Party's position on the monarchy, as well as the future of the party itself, looked uncertain after the debacle in the European election and Rubalcaba's resignation seemed to have also played a key part in precipitating the King's decision. PM Rajoy said, on the day the King announced he would abdicate, that "This is the best time [for it to happen], within a short time the Prince shall be proclaimed King".

Notes

References
Opinion poll sources

Other

External links
European elections Spain in Europe Politique.

2014
Spain
European Parliament